Jorge Alberto Furtado (born June 9, 1959) is a Brazilian film and television director and screenwriter.

Life and career 
Furtado attended university for courses in medicine, psychology, journalism and arts but didn't graduate. He began his professional career in the 1980s on a local channel called TVE-RS working as reporter, presenter, editor, screenwriter and producer. In 1982 created a TV show called "Quizumba", that mixed fiction and documentary with very audacious language for the Brazilian public television.

Between 1984 and 1986, Furtado was director of the museum "Museu de Comunicação Social Hipólito José da Costa" in Porto Alegre. At the same time, with the help of José Pedro Goulart and Ana Luiza Azevedo, he created the company "Luz Produções", where he made two short films and produced plays for theater. From 1986 to 1990, he made dozens of TV commercials.

In 1987, he was one of the founders of Casa de Cinema de Porto Alegre, in which he still participates. In 1990, he worked on TV Globo making scripts for many TV series.

In 2008, Harvard University promoted an exhibition of his films called "Jorge Furtado's Porto Alegre".

Filmography

Film

Television

Awards 
 2003: "Grande Prêmio Cinema Brasil" as best director and best original script for The Man Who Copied.
 2003: Best script on the "Brazilian Film Festival of Miami", for The Man Who Copied.
 2003: Critics' award on the "Festival Internacional de Punta del Este" for The Man Who Copied.
 2004: Prêmio ACIE de Cinema for Best Picture for The Man Who Copied.
 2002: "Grande Prêmio Cinema Brasil" for best original script with Two summers.
 2002: Best movie award on "Cine Ceará" for Two Summers.
 2002: Best director award on "Cine Ceará" for Two Summers.
 2002: Best movie award on "Festival de Cinema Brasileiro" in Paris, for Two Summers.
 1995: "Kikito" of Best Brazilian movie on the "Festival de Gramado" for Felicidade é….
 1989: Best short movie on the Berlin International Film Festival for Island of Flowers.
 1988: Best short movie on the Havana Film Festival for Barbosa.
 1986: Best short movie on the festivals of Gramado, Havana and Huelva, with The Day Dorival Faced the Guards.

References

External links

 
 Site of Casa de Cinema de Porto Alegre
 Official website of the movie "O Mercado de Notícias"

See also
Cinema of Brazil
Lists of Brazilian films
List of Brazilian directors

Living people
People from Porto Alegre
People from Rio Grande do Sul
1959 births
Brazilian film directors
Federal University of Rio Grande do Sul alumni
Authors of Brazilian telenovelas
Brazilian male writers
Male television writers